Paramaxillaria is a genus of moths of the family Pyralidae erected by H. Inoue in 1955.

Species
Paramaxillaria amatrix (Zerny, 1927)
Paramaxillaria meretrix (Staudinger, 1879)

References

Phycitini
Pyralidae genera